is a private university in Kita-ku, Kyoto in Kyoto Prefecture, Japan. The school's predecessor was founded in 1912, and it was chartered as a junior college in 1949. Bukkyo means Buddhism in Japanese, and the university's philosophy is based on Pure Land Buddhism.

External links
 Official website

Educational institutions established in 1912
Private universities and colleges in Japan
Buddhist universities and colleges in Japan
Pure Land Buddhism
Universities and colleges in Kyoto Prefecture
1912 establishments in Japan
Kansai Collegiate American Football League